Camille Claudel 1915 is a 2013 French biographical film written and directed by Bruno Dumont. The film premiered in competition at the 63rd Berlin International Film Festival.

Plot
At the end of her career the sculptor Camille Claudel seems to suffer with mental issues. She destroys her own statues and utters repeatedly that her former lover Auguste Rodin intended to make her life miserable. Consequently, her younger brother Paul sends her to an asylum on the outskirts of Avignon. Claudel tries to convince her doctor she is perfectly sane, while living among patients who obviously are not. She is desperate to see her brother again, hoping he might eventually support her plea.

Cast
 Juliette Binoche as Camille Claudel
 Jean-Luc Vincent as Paul Claudel
 Robert Leroy as the doctor
 Emmanuel Kauffmann as the priest
 Marion Keller as Miss Blanc
 Armelle Leroy-Rolland as the young novice

Reception
On Rotten Tomatoes, they gave the film a "Certified Fresh" award with an aggregated score of 80% based on 37 positive and 9 negative critic reviews.  The website consensus reads: "Camille Claudel, 1915 isn't an easy watch, but Juliette Binoche's excellent performance makes it worth the effort." According to Cine Vue's Patrick Gamble the filmmaker Bruno Dumont has delivered an "incredibly compassionate and humble observation of a tortured artist". Variety's Guy Lodge described the film as a "moving account of a brief period in the later life of the troubled sculptress" and appreciated Juliette Binoche's impersonation of Camille Claudel as nothing less than "mesmerising". Screen Internationals Jonathan Romney ranked this film as "an amplification and indeed a deepening" of Dumont's hitherto existing accomplishments and artistic impact. Eric Kohn of IndieWire stated the film had a "concision" which displayed "an exactitude worthy of Robert Bresson". Analysing the film in depth for The Hollywood Reporter, Jordan Mintzer summed up the film in his "bottom line": "An unsettling portrait of the artist as a mad woman, anchored by a riveting lead performance".

See also
 Camille Claudel, 1988 film
 Rodin, 2017 film

References

External links
 Camille Claudel 1915 at Uni France films
 

2013 biographical drama films
2010s historical films
2013 films
2013 drama films
Films directed by Bruno Dumont
French biographical drama films
French historical films
2010s French-language films
Biographical films about sculptors
Films set in psychiatric hospitals
Films set in 1915
Cultural depictions of Auguste Rodin
Cultural depictions of Camille Claudel
2010s French films